Triple Punch (also sold as Knock Out!!) is a horizontally-scrolling grid capture game released in arcades by K.K. International (K.K.I.) in 1982. The goal is to color all of the lines on a grid while avoiding or punching pursuers. It was sold both as a conversion kit and as an upright cabinet.

Gameplay
The player controls a character referred to as a carpenter who resembles Mario from the original Donkey Kong. Much like Amidar, the objective is to color the lines around all the rectangles, except in Triple Punch the game board is larger than the screen and scrolls horizontally. Completing multiple rectangles at the same time doubles or triples the bonus.

Four enemies chase the player: an eraser, a ghost ("Ottobake"), a gorilla ("Gorigon"), and a fire. The eraser removes already painted lines. The eraser, ghost, and gorilla can be knocked out with three punches in rapid succession; an ambulance takes them away. The fire is always deadly.

See also
Pepper II

References

External links
Triple Punch gameplay video

1982 video games
Arcade video games
Arcade-only video games
Maze games
Vertically-oriented video games
Video games developed in Japan